The Corbin was an American automobile manufactured from 1904 to 1912 in New Britain, Connecticut.  Early cars were air-cooled, but the company later added water-cooling.

History

During 1912, the Model 30 for $2,000 and Model 40 for $3,000 were on display in Madison Square Garden.

See also
 Brass Era car
 List of defunct United States automobile manufacturers

References

David Burgess Wise, The New Illustrated Encyclopedia of Automobiles 

Defunct motor vehicle manufacturers of the United States
Cars introduced in 1904
1900s cars
1910s cars
American companies established in 1904
Vehicle manufacturing companies established in 1904
Vehicle manufacturing companies disestablished in 1912
1904 establishments in Connecticut
1912 disestablishments in Connecticut
New Britain, Connecticut
Brass Era vehicles
Veteran vehicles
Defunct manufacturing companies based in Connecticut